Thallarcha albicollis is a moth of the subfamily Arctiinae first described by Rudolf Felder and Alois Friedrich Rogenhofer in 1875. It is found in Australia, including Tasmania.

References

Lithosiini
Taxa named by Alois Friedrich Rogenhofer
Moths described in 1875